Thomas Paul was an Irish Anglican priest in the second half of the 18th century.

A graduate of Trinity College, Dublin, he was Dean of Cashel  from 1758 until his resignation in 1769. His wife was the sister of Bishop James Hawkins.

References

Deans of Cashel
Alumni of Trinity College Dublin
17th-century Irish Anglican priests